Haley Bishop is an American actress, producer, and screenwriter best known for her roles in films such as Host (2020), Angel Has Fallen (2019), and the horror short Dawn of the Deaf (2016).

Early life and education 
Bishop was raised in the suburbs of Detroit, Michigan. Bishop graduated from San Diego State University in 2010 with a bachelor's degree in Theatre and Performance, and obtained a master's degree from the Royal Central School of Speech and Drama. , she lives in London.

Career 
In 2020, Bishop starred in Host, a Zoom screenlife movie and one of the year's most acclaimed films.

Filmography

Film

Television

Web

References

External links 

 

21st-century American actresses
Living people
Actresses from Detroit
Actresses from Tucson, Arizona
Alumni of the Royal Central School of Speech and Drama
American expatriates in England
American film actresses
American television actresses
San Diego State University alumni
Year of birth missing (living people)